Vomitoria  may refer to:
 plural of vomitorium
 Holly species Ilex vomitoria